Puchheim station is a railway station in the municipality of Puchheim, located in the Fürstenfeldbruck district in Bavaria, Germany.

References

Railway stations in Bavaria
Munich S-Bahn stations
Buildings and structures in Fürstenfeldbruck (district)
Railway stations in Germany opened in 1896